Corralejos is a neighborhood (barrio) of Madrid belonging to the district of Barajas.

As of 1 February 2020, it has a population of 7,808.

References 

Wards of Madrid
Barajas (Madrid)